Arnoldus Antonius Wilhelmus "Nol" Wolf (7 August 1903 – 21 September 1982) was a Dutch long-distance runner. He competed in the men's 5000 metres at the 1928 Summer Olympics.

References

External links

1903 births
1982 deaths
Athletes (track and field) at the 1928 Summer Olympics
Dutch male long-distance runners
Olympic athletes of the Netherlands